George Long may refer to:

George Long (bishop) (1874–1930), Anglican bishop and brigadier general in the Australian Army
George Long (footballer) (born 1993), English football goalkeeper
George Long (scholar) (1800–1879), English classical scholar
  George R. Long, convicted murderer of Lucina C. Broadwell
George S. Long (1883–1958), U.S. representative from Louisiana
George Attmore Long (1911–1999), American lawyer and politician from North Carolina